Hadi TV is an International television channel with a Muslim religious focus, producing programs mainly focusing on the Twelver school of thought. It has been named after the name of 10th Imam Ali al-Hadi and duly called Hadi TV. It is first multilingual Islamic channel to broadcast programmes in more than 15 Languages including English, Urdu, Arabic, Persian, F.Dari, Hausa, Swahili, Pashto, Azeri, French, Turkish, Russian, Kurdi, Thai and Malay languages. The channel is serving a combination of edutainment and infotainment for the community around the world. Hadi TV is producing programs from Pakistan and other countries. In April 2017 telecasting of this channel was banned in Jammu and Kashmir, India by the Central Government of India.

List of channels
Hadi TV 1 (Urdu, English) - Available in South Asia, USA, Canada, Australia, New Zealand and Europe
Hadi TV 2 (Malay, English, Thai, Arabic) - Available in South East Asia and Middle East
Hadi TV 3 (Azeri, Turkish, Russian) - Available in Azerbaijan, Turkey, Kurdistan and Iran
Hadi TV 4 (Farsi, Kurdish, Farsi Dari) - Available in Pakistan, Afghanistan, Iran, Tajikistan, North Africa and Malaysia
Hadi TV 5 (English, French, Hausa, Swahili) - Available in Africa
Hadi TV 6 (Pashto) - Available in Pakistan, Afghanistan
Dua Channel (Arabic) - Available in Malaysia, North Africa and Middle East

U.S. Seizure of Online Sites 
On June 22, 2021, United States law enforcement agencies seized a number of domains including haditv.com. The United States Department of Justice claims the websites it seized was taken for allegedly promoting disinformation campaigns and for violating U.S. sanctions against the Islamic Revolutionary Guard and radical terrorist groups.

See also
 Television in Iraq

References

External links
Official Site

Islamic television networks
Television channels and stations established in 2007
Najaf
Television stations in Iraq
Religious television stations in Pakistan
Shia Islam in Pakistan
Shia media
Domain name seizures by United States